Tyler Austin Biggs (born April 30, 1993) is an American former professional ice hockey player. Biggs was selected in the first round, 22nd overall, in the 2011 NHL Entry Draft by the Toronto Maple Leafs.

Playing career
He played for the Toronto Jr. Canadiens during the 2008–09 season while enrolled at Loveland High School, then transferred to Pioneer High School in Ann Arbor, Michigan, the following fall, to join the USA Hockey National Team Development Program. Biggs played one season with the Miami RedHawks of the Central Collegiate Hockey Association (CCHA) before joining the Oshawa Generals of the Ontario Hockey League for the 2012–13 OHL season.

On July 1, 2015, Biggs was traded to the Pittsburgh Penguins with Phil Kessel, Tim Erixon, and a 2016 2nd round pick for Scott Harrington, Nick Spaling, Kasperi Kapanen, and Pittsburgh's 3rd round pick in the 2016 NHL Entry Draft along with a conditional pick exchange between the teams depending on Pittsburgh's 2016 NHL regular season performance. Toronto also retained 15% of Kessel's salary in this trade.

After two seasons with the Kalamazoo Wings in the ECHL, Biggs left North America as a free agent in signing a one-year contract with UK based club, the Nottingham Panthers of the Elite Ice Hockey League (EIHL) on July 14, 2018. Biggs featured in 24 games with the Panthers, recording 4 goals and 9 points, before opting to return to the ECHL with former club, the Kalamazoo Wings, for the remainder of the 2018–19 season, on December 8, 2018.

Personal life
The son of former NHL centre Don Biggs, Tyler Biggs was born in Binghamton, New York, and grew up in Loveland, Ohio.

International play

Biggs represented the United States internationally, playing for Team USA in the 2010 World U-17 Hockey Challenge, scoring five goals and adding an assist in six games, helping the U.S. to a gold medal finish. That same season, he competed for Team USA in the 2010 IIHF World U18 Championships, finishing the tournament with no points in seven games. A year later, he played in the 2011 IIHF World U18 Championships and scored two goals and one assist in six games during the tournament, including the overtime goal in the semifinal round against Canada.

Career statistics

Regular season and playoffs

International

References

External links 
 

1993 births
Living people
American men's ice hockey right wingers
Ice hockey players from New York (state)
Ice hockey players from Ohio
Kalamazoo Wings (ECHL) players
Miami RedHawks men's ice hockey players
National Hockey League first-round draft picks
Nottingham Panthers players
Ontario Junior Hockey League players
Orlando Solar Bears (ECHL) players
Oshawa Generals players
Sportspeople from Binghamton, New York
People from Loveland, Ohio
Sportspeople from the Cincinnati metropolitan area
Toronto Maple Leafs draft picks
Toronto Marlies players
USA Hockey National Team Development Program players
Wheeling Nailers players
Wilkes-Barre/Scranton Penguins players